David Bruce Dalgleish (born 13 October 1962) is a former Australian politician who served as the state member of Hervey Bay, a city councillor, and deputy mayor of the Fraser Coast region. Born in Epping, he was a licensed motor mechanic, welder and LPG fitter before entering politics, and owned a transport business. In 1998, he was elected to the Legislative Assembly of Queensland as a member of Pauline Hanson's One Nation, representing the seat of Hervey Bay. He remained in the party until December 1999, when he and the other remaining One Nation MPs formed the City Country Alliance under the leadership of Bill Feldman. He was the Alliance spokesman for Emergency Services, Transport and Main Roads, Housing and Public Works. In 2001, he was defeated by Andrew McNamara of the Labor Party. 

Dalgleish was elected as one of 10 councillors for the newly created Fraser Coast Region in 2008, which was initially undivided. He contested the newly created Division 6 in 2012, however was not successful. He again contested Division 6 in 2020 and came second on first preference votes, however was ultimately unsuccessful once preferences were distributed, finishing the official count with 48.14%.

At the 2013 federal election, Dalgleish contested the seat of Hinkler for the Australian Party, finishing fourth with 4.58% of the vote.

References

1962 births
Living people
One Nation members of the Parliament of Queensland
Politicians from Sydney
Members of the Queensland Legislative Assembly
21st-century Australian politicians